Leemor Joshua-Tor is the W.M. Keck Professor of Structural Biology at Cold Spring Harbor Laboratory and a Howard Hughes Medical Institute Investigator. Her research focuses on the role of the argonaute complex in RNA interference.

Early life and education 
Leemor Joshua-Tor was born in Rehovot, Israel. She received a B.S. from Tel-Aviv University in chemistry, then served for three years in the Israeli Defense Forces. She earned a PhD in chemistry in the lab of Joel Sussman from the Weizmann Institute of Science in 1991, then did postdoctoral research at Caltech.

Career 
Joshua-Tor joined the faculty at Cold Spring Harbor Laboratory in 1995 and was promoted to full professor in 2005.
She was Dean of the Watson School of Biological Sciences from 2007 to 2012. She is a faculty advisor of CSHL's Women in Science and Engineering group. She has been an HHMI investigator since 2008.

In 2005, her lab published the structure of argonaute, helping to demonstrate its role in RNA interference, and she is known for her research on argonaute's slicer. She has collaborated extensively with Greg Hannon. Joshua-Tor's research has shed light on how the proteins responsible for RNA interference function.

Awards 
 1996 Beckman Young Investigator Award
Howard Hughes Medical Institute Investigator
 2017 Elected to the National Academy of Sciences
 2017 Elected to the American Academy of Arts and Sciences
 2018 ASBMB Mildred Cohn Award in Biological Chemistry
 2019 Harvey Lecture

References 

Year of birth missing (living people)
Living people
Israeli biochemists
Fellows of the American Academy of Arts and Sciences
Women biochemists
People from Rehovot
Tel Aviv University alumni
Weizmann Institute of Science alumni
20th-century biologists
20th-century American women scientists
21st-century biologists
21st-century American women scientists
Members of the United States National Academy of Sciences